The United Nations has authorized 71 peacekeeping operations as of April 2018. These do not include interventions authorized by the UN like the Korean War and the Gulf War. The 1990s saw the most UN peacekeeping operations to date. Peacekeeping operations are overseen by the Department of Peacekeeping Operations (DPKO) and share some common characteristics, namely the inclusion of a military or police component, often with an authorization for use of force under Chapter VII of the Charter of the United Nations. Peacekeeping operations are distinct from special political missions (SPMs), which are overseen by the Department of Political Affairs (DPA). SPMs are not included in the table below.

1940s

1950s

1960s

1970s

1980s

1990s

2000s

2010s

See also
League of Nations, predecessor of the United Nations
 History of United Nations peacekeeping
List of UN peacekeeping missions
List of countries where UN peacekeepers are currently deployed

External links

UN peacekeeping website

Peacekeeping missions and operations involving the United Nations
United Nations peacekeeping missions
Peacekeeping missions timeline
Peacekeeping missions timeline
Military operations other than war

it:Missioni di pace delle Nazioni Unite
pt:Anexo:Lista das missões de manutenção da paz das Nações Unidas